Sarwar is a city and a sub division in Ajmer district in the Indian state of Rajasthan.
Additionally, it is a Nagar Palika and Panchayat samiti. It is part of the Kekri Assembly and Ajmer Lok Sabha constituencies. It was an independent State of Gaur Rajputs from 12th Century to 16th Century

Geography
It has an average elevation of 337 metres (1105 feet).
It is located on the banks of the river "Die", which is a tributary of the river Banas.
Meaning of word "Sarwar" is an area which is covered by water sources. According to the name, there are many water bodies that are present in the surroundings of Sarwar.

Demographics
 India census, Sarwar had a population of 20,372. Males constitute 51.38% of the population and females 48.61%. Sarwar has an average literacy rate of 64.65%, lower than the national average of 74.04%: male literacy is 78.43%, and female literacy is 50.07%. In Sarwar, 16.24% of the population is under 6 years of age.
Sarwar is 16 km from town kekri and 64 km from District Ajmer.

References

External links
 Sarwar - Location on Google Maps

Cities and towns in Ajmer district